Stephen Wolf Previn (born Wolf Stefan Priwin; 21 October 1925 – 9 July 1993) was a German-born American director of television episodes and feature films and film production executive. Previn began his film career in 1943 as an editor for MGM and later Universal Studios.  In 1950, he moved to Europe.  Previn directed numerous television series, and a decade later, directed several features for Walt Disney in Europe.

In 1965 he went to work for Eon Productions in London as a television executive and in 1966 joined Paramount London as a film executive. In 1970 he segued to Commonwealth United Entertainment, Inc., as a production executive and also freelanced in Europe on several films.

While living in London, Previn, in the 1970s, served as the English Representative and Production Executive for American International Pictures.

He was the brother of musician André Previn and second cousin once-removed of American-born film composer Charles Previn.

Filmography 
As production executive
 Venus in Furs (1969)
 Justine de Sade
 Hennessy (American International Pictures) (1975)
 A Matter of Time (American International Pictures) (1976)
 The People That Time Forgot (American International Pictures) (1977)
As producer
 Battle of Neretva, August 19, 1970 †
As director
 Almost Angels (Disney) (26 September 1962)
 The Waltz King (Disney) (1963)
 Escapade in Florence (Disney) (1962)
  (1963)
As editor
 Gunman in the Streets (1950)

 † 1969 Academy Award nominee for Best Foreign Film

Television 
 Captain Video and His Video Rangers
 aka Captain Video - USA (alternative title)

 In the Clutches of the Klaw (18 February 1952) – director
 Shipwrecked (3 March 1952) – director
 Birth of the 'Galaxy (24 March 1952) – director
 Operation Micromail (21 April 1952) – director
 Operation Venus (16 May 1952) – director
 Space Race (7 July 1952) – director
 The Threat of the Rogue World (25 July 1952) – director
 The Green King (22 September 1952) – director

 Foreign Intrigue aka Cross Current - USA (rerun title)
 aka Dateline: Europe - USA (rerun title)
 aka Overseas Adventures - USA (rerun title)

 The Third Partner (1 January 1954) – director
 The Brotherhood (1 January 1954) – director
 Sabotage (1 January 1954) – director
 Witness at Large (1 January 1954) – director
 The Mills of God (8 April 1954) – director
 Waterfront Story (22 October 1954) – director
 The Trumpet Player (4 November 1954) – director
 International Robbery (11 November 1954) – director
 The Stamp Collector (18 November 1954) – director
 The Jewel Thief (25 November 1954) - Director
 The Poisoned Teacup (2 December 1954) – director
 The Playful Prince (9 December 1954) – director
 Kurt Hallen Story (1 January 1955) – director
 Night Fighter (1 January 1955) – director
 Two Men from Zurich (12 March 1955) – director
 The Broken Wishbone (19 March 1955) – director
 The Concert Pianist (26 March 1955) – director
 The Secret Plane (2 April 1955) – director
 Revenge (16 April 1955) – director
 Full Circle (16 April 1955) – director
 The Diplomat (23 April 1955) – director
 Little Romeo (30 April 1955) – director
 Big Brother (14 May 1955) – director
 Miss Fortune (21 May 1955) – director
 The Reluctant Killer (28 May 1955) – director
 The Beauty (4 June 1955) – director
 First Blush (11 June 1955) – director
 Run Around (18 June 1955) – director
 Delores (25 June 1955) – director

 Sherlock Holmes  (8 November 1954) – director
 The Case of the Shoeless Engineer (3 January 1955) – director
 The Case of the Split Ticket (10 January 1955) – director
 The Case of the French Interpreter (17 January 1955) – director
 The Case of the Singing Violin (24 January 1955) – director
 The Case of the Greystone Inscription (31 January 1955) – director
 The Case of the Thistle Killer (14 February 1955) – director
 The Case of the Vanished Detective (21 February 1955) – director
 The Case of the Careless Suffragette (28 February 1955) – director
 The Case of the Reluctant Carpenter (7 March 1955) – director
 The Case of the Christmas Pudding (4 April 1955) – director
 The Night Train Riddle (11 April 1955) – director
 The Case of the Violent Suitor (18 April 1955) – director
 The Case of the Perfect Husband (2 May 1955) – director
 The Case of the Jolly Hangman (9 May 1955) – director
 The Case of the Imposter Mystery (16 May 1955) – director
 The Case of the Eiffel Tower (23 May 1955) – director
 The Case of the Exhumed Client (30 May 1955) – director
 The Case of the Impromptu Performance (6 June 1955) – director
 The Case of the Baker Street Bachelors (20 June 1955) – director
 The Case of the Royal Murder (27 June 1955) – director
 The Case of the Haunted Gainsborough (4 July 1955) – director
 The Case of the Neurotic Detective (11 July 1955) – director
 The Case of the Unlucky Gambler (18 July 1955) – director
 The Case of the Tyrant's Daughter (17 October 1955) – director

 Walt Disney's Wonderful World of Color aka Disneyland - USA (original title)
 aka Disney's Wonderful World - USA (new title)
 aka The Disney Sunday Movie - USA (new title)
 aka The Magical World of Disney - USA (new title)
 aka The Wonderful World of Disney - USA (new title)
 aka Walt Disney - USA (new title)
 aka Walt Disney Presents - USA (new title)

 Escapade in Florence: Part 1 (30 September 1962) – director
 Escapade in Florence: Part 2 (7 October 1962) – director
 The Waltz King: Part 1 (27 October 1963) – director
 The Waltz King: Part 2 (3 November 1963) – director
 Almost Angels: Part 1 (28 February 1965) – director
 Almost Angels: Part 2 (7 March 1965) – director

 Run for Your Life How to Sell Your Soul for Fun and Profit (18 October 1965) – director

 Immigration to the United States 
Steve's father, Jack Previn (Jacob Priwin; 1885–1963), had been an attorney and judge in Germany before fleeing from the Nazis to the United States.

Jacob Priwin listed his cousin, Leo Previn (1884–1954) (who lived on the Upper West Side in Manhattan), as his U.S. contact. Charlotte, Andreas, and Leonore then sailed from New York to Los Angeles from November 26, 1938, to December 11, 1938, aboard the SS City of Newport News.

In Los Angeles, Jack Previn turned a hobby as a musician into a career as a music teacher.

Steve Previn was married to Elizabeth Previn.  They had a son, Nicholas Previn.

 References General references International Motion Picture Almanac, 1975 edition, Quigley Publishing Co., New York (1975)
 International Motion Picture Almanac, 1976 edition, Quigley Publishing Co., New York (1976)
 International Motion Picture Almanac, 1977 edition, Quigley Publishing Co., New York (1977)
 International Motion Picture Almanac, 1978 edition, Quigley Publishing Co., New York (1978)
 International Motion Picture Almanac, 1979 edition, Quigley Publishing Co., New York (1979)
 International Motion Picture Almanac, 1980 edition, Quigley Publishing Co., New York (1980)
 International Motion Picture Almanac, 1981 edition, Quigley Publishing Co., New York (1981)
 International Motion Picture Almanac, 1982 edition, Quigley Publishing Co., New York (1982)
 International Motion Picture Almanac, 1984 edition, Quigley Publishing Co., New York (1984)
 International Motion Picture Almanac, 1986 edition, Quigley Publishing Co., New York (1986)Inline citations'

American television directors
American people of German-Jewish descent
1925 births
1993 deaths
Previn family
German emigrants to the United States